The Complete Reprise Sessions is a box set released in 2006 featuring both of Gram Parsons's early 1970s solo albums, GP and Grievous Angel. The box set features interviews and previously unreleased alternate takes.

Track listing

Disc one
"Still Feeling Blue" – 2:43
"We'll Sweep out the Ashes in the Morning" – 3:14
"A Song for You" – 5:00
"Streets of Baltimore" – 2:55
"She" – 5:01
"That's All It Took" – 3:01
"The New Soft Shoe" – 3:55
"Kiss the Children" – 3:00
"Cry One More Time" – 3:41
"How Much I've Lied" – 2:29
"Big Mouth Blues" – 3:58
GP Radio Promo – 1:01
How Did You Meet Emmylou Harris? – 1:54
The Story Behind "A Song for You"? – 0:23
The Story Behind "The New Soft Shoe"? – 0:54
WBCN Interview with Maxanne Sartori – 2:30
"Love Hurts" – 4:58
"Sin City" – 5:20

Disc two
"Return of the Grievous Angel" – 4:26
"Hearts on Fire" – 3:52
"I Can't Dance" – 2:24
"Brass Buttons" – 3:30
"$1000 Wedding" – 5:05
"Medley from Northern Quebec: Cash on the Barrelhead/Hickory Wind" – 6:28
"Love Hurts" – 3:42
"Ooh Las Vegas" – 3:32
"In My Hour of Darkness" – 3:49
"Return of the Grievous Angel" – 4:32
Did You Sing "Hickory Wind" at the Grand Ole Opry? – 1:50
What Differences Do You See Between Pure Country and Country Rock? – 1:09

Disc three
"She" (Alternate Version) – 4:58
"That's All It Took" (Alternate Version) – 3:02
"Still Feeling Blue" (Alternate Version) – 2:40
"Kiss the Children" (Alternate Version) – 2:59
"Streets of Baltimore" (Alternate Version) – 3:00
"We'll Sweep Out the Ashes in the Morning" (Alternate Version) – 3:18
"The New Soft Shoe" (Alternate Version) – 4:05
"Return of the Grievous Angel #1" (Alternate Version) – 4:28
"In My Hour of Darkness" (Alternate Version) – 3:46
"Ooh Las Vegas" (Alternate Version) – 3:45
"I Can't Dance" (Alternate Version) – 2:25
"Sleepless Nights" (Alternate Version) – 3:36
"Love Hurts" (Alternate Version) – 3:47
"Brass Buttons" (Alternate Version) – 3:27
"Hickory Wind" (Alternate Version)– 4:17
"Brand New Heartache" – 2:27
"Sleepless Nights" – 3:26
"The Angels Rejoiced Last Night" – 2:24

Personnel 
Gram Parsons - Acoustic Guitar, Vocals
Emmylou Harris - Vocals
Barry Tashian - Guitar, Vocals
Byron Berline - Fiddle, Mandolin
James Burton - Dobro, Electric Guitar
John Conrad - Bass
Buddy Emmons - Pedal Steel
Kim Fowley - Background vocals
Sam Goldstein - Drums
Emory Gordy Jr. - Bass
Rick Grech - Bass
John Guerin - Drums
Glen Hardin - Organ, Piano
Bernie Leadon - Acoustic Guitar, Dobro, Guitar
Alan Munde - Banjo
Herb Pedersen - Acoustic & Electric Guitar, Vocals
Al Perkins - Pedal Steel
Steve Snyder - Vibraphone
N.D. Smart - Drums on "Sin City"
Ronnie Tutt - Drums

References

External links
 The Complete Reprise Sessions at Rhino.com

Gram Parsons compilation albums
2006 compilation albums
Rhino Records compilation albums